The 1987 National Panasonic Cup was the 14th edition of the NSWRL Midweek Cup, a NSWRL-organised national club Rugby League tournament between the leading clubs from the NSWRL, the BRL, the CRL, Papua New Guinea and State Representative Teams.

A total of 20 teams from across Australia and Papua New Guinea played 19 matches in a straight knock-out format, with the matches being held midweek during the premiership season.

Qualified Teams

Venues

Preliminary rounds

Round 1

Quarter finals

Semi finals

Final

Player of the Series
 Ben Elias (Balmain)

Golden Try
 Steve O'Brien (Canterbury-Bankstown)

Sources
 https://web.archive.org/web/20070929092939/http://users.hunterlink.net.au/~maajjs/aus/nsw/sum/nsw1987.htm
 Rugby League Project - Port Moresby Vipers

References

1987
1987 in Australian rugby league
1987 in New Zealand rugby league